Sherewala is a village in the Punjab province of Pakistan. It is located at 30°47'0N 74°14'15E with an altitude of 178 metres (587 feet).

References

Villages in Punjab, Pakistan